A kontigi or kuntigi is a one- or three-stringed African lute. The one string version is used among the Songhai and Djerma. The 3-string version teharden is used among the Tamashek.

The instrument is also used in Hausa music, primarily in northern Nigeria and Niger, and among Hausa minorities in Benin, Ghana, Burkina Faso and Cameroon. It is also found among Islamized peoples throughout West Africa (see Xalam). The best-known player of the kontigi is Dan Maraya.

Characteristics
The instrument uses a calabash gourd as the body of the instrument, covered by skin, with a stick for a neck. The neck on the Kontigi has "metal disk surrounded by small rings" which make noise as the instrument is moved or played. The tone is high pitched.

References

Nigerian musical instruments
African musical instruments
West Africa
Hausa musical instruments